The Eleventh Hour is a 1922 British silent film. One of a number of adaptations of Ethel M. Dell's romance novels made around this time, the film revolves around Doris Elliott (Madge White), who marries farmer Jeff Ironside (Dennis Wyndham), but quickly tires of farm life, and leaves him, only to realise her mistake and return just before Ironside commits suicide - hence "the eleventh hour" of the title. It is unknown whether any recording of the film survives; it may be a lost film.

Cast
 Madge White as Doris Elliot  
 Dennis Wyndham as Jeff Ironside  
 Phillip Simmons as Hugh Chesyl  
 M. Gray Murray as Colonel Elliot  
 Beatrice Chester as Mrs. Elliot

References

1922 films
British silent feature films
Films directed by George Ridgwell
Films based on works by Ethel M. Dell
Films based on short fiction
British black-and-white films
Stoll Pictures films
1920s English-language films